Ashley Russell Griffiths (born 5 January 1961) is a retired Welsh Association football player.

England career
Griffins played seven games over two seasons for Bristol Rovers F.C. His debut came in the last game of the 1979–80 Football League season.

Welsh career
Griffins played extensively in the Welsh Premier League, including successes with Barry Town United F.C. where he was also an assistant manager and manager.  He was ultimately introduced to the club hall of fame.

References

External links

1961 births
Living people
English Football League players
National League (English football) players
Cymru Premier players
Barry Town United F.C. players
Bristol Rovers F.C. players
Torquay United F.C. players
Yeovil Town F.C. players
Enfield F.C. players
Redbridge Forest F.C. players
Newport County A.F.C. players
Inter Cardiff F.C. players
Association football midfielders
Welsh footballers